"Den döda vinkeln" (Swedish for The Blind Spot, literally: The Dead Angle) is a 2005 single by Swedish alternative rock band Kent, from the album Du & jag döden. It was released without a B-side. The one track single was initially intended to be a promotion single only, but the record company decided to make it an official release.

Track listing

Charts

References

Kent (band) songs
2005 singles
2005 songs
Songs written by Joakim Berg